Sir Arcot Lakshmanaswami Mudaliar , FRCOG, FACS (14 October 1887 – 15 April 1974) was an Indian educationist and physician. He was the identical younger twin brother of Sir A. R. Mudaliar. Initial education was in Kurnool and they moved to Chennai in 1903.

He pursued his education from the Madras Christian College. He later went on to become the longest serving Vice-Chancellor of Madras University (for 27 years) and principal of Madras Medical College. He was also the Deputy Leader of the Indian delegation to the First World Health Assembly in Geneva in 1948. He was elected as the chairman of the World Health Organization (WHO) Executive Board in 1949 and 1950, was Vice-President of the Eighth World Health Assembly in 1955 and President of the Fourteenth World Health Assembly.

Awards and honors
 He was knighted in the 1945 New Year Honours, 
 Awarded the Padma Bhushan in 1954 and the Padma Vibhushan in 1963.
 He was the General president of 46th Indian Science Congress held in 1959.

Textbooks
 Clinical Obstetrics first edition 1938; later revised as Mudaliar and Menon, 10th edition,

References

 S. Muthiah, Achievements in double The Hindu, 13 October 2003 accessed at  3 August 2006
 The Second Decade, 50 years of WHO in SE Asia, accessed at  3 August 2006
 Dr. Vedagiri Shanmugasundaram, Life and Times of the Great Twins: Dr. Sir. A. Ramasamy and Dr. Sir. A. Lakshmanasamy, The Modern Rationalist, November 2004, accessed at  3 August 2006
 Bio details from honorary degree at Hong Kong University 
 Bio details from honorary doctorate of civil laws degree at Oxford University

1887 births
1974 deaths
Indian medical academics
20th-century Indian medical doctors
Recipients of the Padma Vibhushan in medicine
Knights Bachelor
Indian Knights Bachelor
Madras Christian College alumni
Indian Tamil academics
Tamil physicians
Vice Chancellors of the University of Madras
Dewan Bahadurs
University of Madras alumni
Recipients of the Padma Bhushan in literature & education
20th-century Indian educational theorists
Medical doctors from Chennai